Peter Crittenden is a British lichenologist. His research largely concerns the ecophysiology of lichens. Crittenden is known for using new techniques to study lichens, such as the use of 3D printing and X-ray computed tomography to study lichen structure and development. He served as the senior editor of the scientific journal The Lichenologist from the years 2000–2016; and still serves on the editorial board for the journal Fungal Ecology. Crittenden was the president of the British Lichen Society in 1998–1999, and president of the International Association for Lichenology from 2008 to 2012. He was awarded the Acharius Medal at the 10th International Mycological Congress in Bangkok in 2014, for his lifetime achievements in lichenology.

Biography
Crittenden studied botany at the University of London, where he graduated in 1971. He spent two summer vacation studentships working under the supervision of Peter Wilfred James. For his PhD, he moved to Sheffield to study ecology under David Read, researching the effect of sulphur dioxide pollution on pasture grasses. Crittenden started working with lichens after moving to Canada as a research fellow at McMaster University. With his supervisor Ken Kershaw, he studied the role of lichens in the nitrogen cycle in boreal-arctic ecosystems. Much of his research involved determining nitrogenase activity in the mat-forming lichen Stereocaulon paschale. Crittenden eventually settled into a lectureship at the University of Nottingham in 1981, where he remains and is Leverhulme Emeritus Professor as of 2021.

Selected publications

References

British lichenologists
Living people
Acharius Medal recipients
Alumni of the University of London
Alumni of the University of Sheffield
Academics of the University of Nottingham
20th-century British scientists
21st-century British scientists
Year of birth missing (living people)